The Bellamya was a supertanker, built in 1976 by Chantiers de l'Atlantique at Saint-Nazaire for the French branch of Shell Oil. She was the second Batillus class supertanker. Bellamya, together with her sister ships Batillus, Pierre Guillaumat and Prairial, was one of the biggest ships in the world, surpassed in size only by Seawise Giant (later Jahre Viking, Happy Giant and Knock Nevis) built in 1976, and extended in 1981, although the four ships of the Batillus class had a larger gross tonnage.  If size is indicated by gross tonnage—a measure of volume—Bellamya was the largest ship ever built.

History 
The contract to build the Batillus class supertankers was signed on April 6, 1971, and the first sheet metal was cut in January 1975. Meanwhile, the oil shock caused by the Yom Kippur War in October 1973 resulted in higher oil prices and reduced imports by industrialized countries. The cancellation of the orders was seriously considered, but Shell concluded that it was better to continue, mostly to not put the shipyard in a very difficult position by withdrawing such a huge, already initiated project (the work commitments were already well advanced, with extremely heavy cancellation charges). It was also hoped for an improvement in market conditions.

The ship was completed and put in service in 1976, months after the completion of her sister ship Batillus, and that of the new, purposely built, oil terminal Antifer, near Le Havre, one of very few ports in the world capable of accommodating Batillus class tankers.

The international oil market however, did not improve; her size also placed restrictions on where she could be employed, and this must have led to her early demise. Active service ended when Bellamya was laid up at Vestnes, Norway, on January 26, 1984, and she arrived at Ulsan, South Korea, on January 6, 1986 to be scrapped.

Technical data
Length overall was 414.22 m, beam 63.01 m, draft 28.50 m, deadweight tonnage 553,662, and gross tonnage 275,276. Propulsion was provided by two propellers each driven by two Stal-Laval steam turbines developing a total capacity of 64,800 Hp. The service speed was 16.7 knots, with fuel consumption of about 330 tonnes of heavy oil per day and fuel enough for 42 days.

The cargo was carried in 40 tanks with a total volume of 677,300 m3. They were divided into central and lateral tanks, whose dimensions was designed to reduce considerably the risk of pollution caused by collision or grounding. Ahead of the international standards of the time, the wing tanks had a maximum unit volume not exceeding 17,000 m3, which was reduced to 9,000 m3 in the most vulnerable parts of ship.

See also

Batillus class supertankers
Batillus
Pierre Guillaumat
Prairial

References

External links
 Gallery and technical information at  aukevisser.nl
 Article "Le Marin" du 5 juillet 1996  
 Bellamya at helderline.nl
 Les pétroliers de 550.000 tonnes Gallery and various information 

Ships built in France
1976 ships
Tankers of France
Oil tankers
Shell plc